Alchemilla bursensis is a species of lady's mantle that is endemic to two sites in northwestern Turkey; the Tahtaköprü forest and near Sincanlı. It inhabits streamsides and banks under beech forests. It is likely to be threatened by climate change and forestry.

References

bursensis
Endemic flora of Turkey
Near threatened flora of Asia